Bocana silenusalis is a moth of the family Erebidae first described by Francis Walker in 1858. It is widespread in Asia from India to Borneo.

References

Digital Moths of Japan - with images

Herminiinae